Evil Urges is the fifth studio album by My Morning Jacket. It was released by ATO Records on June 10, 2008. 
The album was nominated for the 2008 Grammy Award for Best Alternative Music Album, ultimately losing to Radiohead's In Rainbows.

Writing and recording
Writing began in Colorado, while recording was done in Manhattan. According to producer Joe Chiccarelli, the demos he was sent, which were "very groove-oriented with hints of old-fashioned R&B", suggested a more urban record than previous albums, and as such he recommended the band record in an urban environment that had some "life and vitality". After looking into various options including Vancouver and San Francisco, the band eventually decided to record in New York.

Singer and lead songwriter Jim James said that the band wanted to get away from "normal rock and roll sounds" and emulate more of the band's live sound. Many of the songs were previewed at the 2008 South by Southwest music festival.

Promotion
My Morning Jacket played "I'm Amazed" and "Evil Urges" on Saturday Night Live on May 10, 2008.  At the Bonnaroo Music Festival in June 2008, the band played a near four hour set, playing all songs on the album except "Look at You" and "Remnants".

The season six premiere of The CW's teen drama One Tree Hill was titled "Touch Me I'm Going to Scream" and featured the songs "Highly Suspicious" and "Look at You."

On November 22, 2009, the American Dad! episode "My Morning Straitjacket" featured the band members playing themselves. The episode utilised four songs from Evil Urges: "Touch Me I'm Going to Scream Part 2", "I'm Amazed", "Highly Suspicious" and "Remnants."

Critical reception

Evil Urges received mostly positive reviews from contemporary music critics. At Metacritic, which assigns a normalized rating out of 100 to reviews from mainstream critics, the album received an average score of 67, based on 31 reviews, which indicates "generally favorable reviews".

Accolades

Track listing

Personnel
My Morning Jacket
 Jim James – vocals, guitars, bass, drums, percussion, Omnichord
 Tom "Two Tone Tommy" Blakenship – bass
 Patrick Hallahan – drums, percussion
 Carl Broemel – guitars, vocals, pedal steel, lap steel
 Bo Koster – keyboards, programming, vocals, piano, synthesizers, organ, Rhodes, percussion

Additional personnel
 Jim James, Joe Chiccarelli – production
 Michael Brauer – mixing
 Bob Ludwig – mastering
 Artie Smith – drum tech
 David Campbell – string arrangements

Assistance
 Rick Kwan, Colin Suzuki, Will Hensley, Kyle Mc Innis, Lowell Reynolds, Andy Taub

Charts

References

External links
 

2008 albums
My Morning Jacket albums
Rough Trade Records albums
ATO Records albums
Albums produced by Jim James
Albums produced by Joe Chiccarelli